Granton Station may refer to:

 Granton railway station
 Granton Gasworks railway station
 Granton Road railway station